Igor Stravinsky's The Soldier's Tale is a solo work by English rock musician Roger Waters, released on 26 October 2018 by Sony Classical Masterworks. It was recorded on 11 to 12 December in 2014 at Bridgehampton Presbyterian Church. It is an adaptation of the narration for Igor Stravinsky’s 1918 theatrical work. In 2018, Waters recorded this version with members of the Bridgehampton Chamber Music Festival, in which he narrates his adaptation of the story and portrays all characters.

Track listing

Part I

Part II

See also
 L'Histoire du soldat

References

External links

2018 albums
Roger Waters albums
Sony Classical Records albums